Cecil Richard Graeme (3 June 1873 - 1912) was an Australian rules footballer who played with St Kilda in the Victorian Football League (VFL).

References

External links 

1873 births
Australian rules footballers from Victoria (Australia)
St Kilda Football Club players
People educated at Wesley College (Victoria)
1912 deaths